Bittersweet Memories (lit. My Life in Cinemascope)  is a Quebec, Canada film released in 2004. This biographical drama depicted the career of Quebec singer Alys Robi, as portrayed by Pascale Bussières. The film makes use of flashback sequences in order to connect her childhood, adolescence and adulthood to her later emotional crisis.

Plot
Alice, later Alys, is a teenager who wants to go to Montreal to have a career as a singer.  She receives an offer to join Jean Grimaldi's comedy show, and begins an affair with his married son Olivier, despite her Catholic upbringing.

Canada joins the Allies in the Second World War, with protests in Quebec against conscription.  Alys begins touring Quebec's military bases, giving her a successful career as a pin-up girl.  She eventually meets Lucio Agostini, a composer and married man, who gets her a job with the Canadian Broadcasting Corporation.  She wants him to marry her, which her refuses, which triggers her descent into addiction and depression.

Her condition worsens when her little brother Gerard is diagnosed with spina bifida, a birth defect that will later take his life.  She is eventually diagnosed with hebephrenia, a form of schizophrenia.  She spends five and a half years in an asylum, receiving multiple electroshock therapies and a lobotomy.  The treatment is successful, and she returns to her career.

External links

Ma Vie en cinémascope at The Canadian Encyclopedia 

2004 films
Quebec films
Canadian drama films
Films about entertainers
2004 drama films
French-language Canadian films
2000s French-language films
2000s Canadian films